The Spilopsyllinae form a flea subfamily (or depending on classifications a tribe called the Spilopsyllini) in the family Pulicidae.

References

External links

Insect subfamilies
Pulicidae
Taxa named by Anthonie Cornelis Oudemans